Vaiges is a commune in the Mayenne department and Pays de la Loire region of France.

Geography
The river Vaige forms part of the commune's northern border, then traverses the commune's territory from north to south before forming part of its south-western border.

See also
Communes of the Mayenne department

References

Communes of Mayenne